Glipa subsinuatipennis is a species of beetle in the genus Glipa. It was described in 1936.

References

subsinuatipennis
Beetles described in 1936